Çukurova is a district in the Adana Province of Turkey. District population of 389,000,
is concentrated within the city of Adana, occupying north-west of the city. It is a modern residential district which came into being in the last 30 years as the city expanded north. Çukurova is located north of the Seyhan district, west of the Seyhan River and south of the Seyhan Reservoir.

Geography 

The district constitutes the northern Adana.

History 
The land that Çukurova district now occupies was made up of orchards, forestry and scattered villages. After Aytaç Durak's election as the mayor of Adana, an extensive urban plan was made. The urban plan consisted of 200,000 homes, several parks, schools and shopping places to be built over the next 30 years. The project was named as New Adana and the area grew rapidly during the 1990s.

Governance
Çukurova district is administered by three levels of government; central government, provincial administration and the municipalities.

Çukurova Governorship is the district branch of the central government operating under the Adana Governorship. The chief executive of the Çukurova district is the District Governor who is appointed by the Ministry of Internal Affairs. Çukurova Governorship overseas the functioning of the district directorates of the ministries.

Çukurova directorate of the Adana Province Special Administration is the district branch of the provincial administration. Çukurova district is represented with 7 members at the 61-member Adana Provincial Parliament.

Çukurova district is divided into Çukurova municipality and the villages.

Çukurova Municipality

There is only one municipality incorporated in the Çukurova district. Çukurova Municipality is a lower tier municipality of the city of Adana and serves most of the district. The municipality is further divided into neighborhoods.

Çukurova Municipality was incorporated in 2008 as a lower-tier municipality of the city of Adana, after the split of the northern section from Seyhan district.

Mayor is the chief executive of the municipality, presides municipal departments and chairs the municipal council. Mayoral candidates are either nominated by the national parties or run independently. The mayor is elected by first past the post voting for a 5-year term.

Encümen is the executive committee of the Çukurova Municipality.The mayor presides the encümen and the committee consists of 7 members, 3 councilors elected from the municipal council, 3 department directors appointed by the mayor and the treasurer.

Municipal Council is the decision making organ of the Çukurova Municipality. It is responsible for approving by-laws, founding, splitting or amalgamating neighborhoods, strategic planning, urban development planning and zoning, making investments, budgeting, loaning and controlling the mayor's activities. The chair of the council is the mayor. The council consists of 37 members. The candidates for the councilor positions are either nominated by National Parties or run independently. The councilors are elected by the d'Hondt method, where the whole municipality is one electoral district and there is 10% threshold for a party to gain seat at the council. As with mayor, councilors are elected for a 5-year term. Left leaning CHP  leads the council with 18 members, Turkish nationalist MHP has 10, conservative AKP has 7 members at the council and two members are independent.

|-
|1
|CHP
|align="right"|Soner Çetin
|align="right"|125,467
|align="right"|58,37
|-
|2
|MHP
|align="right"|Yusuf Baş
|align="right"|78,194
|align="right"|36,38
|-
|3
|SP
|align="right"|İbrahim Ethem Can
|align="right"|4050
|align="right"|1,88
|-

Villages

Villages are the administrative units outside the municipal areas and are administered by the muhtar and the Village Seniors Council. The council can have 4, 5 or 6 members depending on the population of the village. Unlike the neighborhood muhtars, village muhtars are granted special powers and the village administration is considered to be a governmental body. In Çukurova district, there are total of 11 villages: Bozcalar, Dörtler, Fadıl, Kabasakal, Karahan, Küçükçınar, Keşoba, Memişli, Örçün, Pirirli and Söğütlü.

According to Law act no 6360, all villages in metropolitan municipalities in Turkey (such as Adana) were renamed as a neighborhoods. Thus the villages listed above are officially neighborhoods of Adana.

Neighborhoods
Neighborhoods (Mahalle) are small administrative units within the municipalities, and are administered by the muhtar and the Neighborhood Seniors Council consisting of 4 members. Muhtar and the Senior Council are elected for 5 years at the local elections and are not affiliated with political parties. Neighborhoods are not an incorporation therefore do not hold government status. Muhtar, although being elected by the residents, acts merely as an administrator of the district governor. Muhtar can voice the neighborhood issues to the municipal hall together with the Seniors Council.

Çukurova has a total of 27 neighborhoods. Fourteen of them are in the urban area and thirteen of them are outside the urban area. The neighborhoods outside the urban area are the former villages and the municipalities that annexed to the city of Adana as city borders are expanded in 2008.

Neighborhoods in the urban area

The urban neighborhoods of Çukurova are spread into 3 distinctive zones. The major separators of these zones are the Adana Metro and the Turgut Özal boulevard.

North of Turgut Özal Boulevard: The most scenic section of Adana, the zone is all residential, villas on the hills overlooking to the Seyhan Reservoir and high rise buildings along Turgut Özal and Süleyman Demirel Boulevards. This zone is bounded with Özal Boulevard on the south, Sadık Ahmet Boulevard on the west and Seyhan Reservoir on the north. The 4 neighborhoods of this zone are, Beyazevler, Güzelyalı, Karslılar and Kurttepe.

East of the Adana Metro: Bounded with Turgut Özal Boulevard on the east and north, Adana Metro on the west and Seyhan district on the south, this zone is heavily residential. The 3 neighborhoods of this zone are, Yurt, Mahfesığmaz and Toros.

West of the Adana Metro: Bounded by Adana Metro on the west, Turgut Özal Boulevard on the north, Tapantepe Road on the west and Seyhan district on the south, this zone is rapidly developing area of the city. Western section is zoned for low-rise and eastern section is heavily residential with high-rise buildings. The 5 neighborhoods of the zone are, Huzurevleri, Belediye Evleri, Yüzüncüyıl, Esentepe, Kabasakal and Şambayadı.

Neighborhoods outside the urban area
As the city borders expanded the municipalities and villages in the new limits of the city are annexed to the city. Neighborhoods of the former municipalities and former villages then became part of the Çukurova district as neighborhoods. There are total of 4 non-urban neighborhoods, all used to be part of the former Salbaş municipality; Salbaş Esentepe, Kocatepe, Yeni Mahalle and Gökkuyu.

Transportation
Local public transportation in Çukurova district is conducted by the Adana Metro, Adana Metropolitan Municipality Buse and the minibuses.

Adana Metro serves with 4 stations in Çukurova: Hastane, Anadolu Lisesi, Huzurevi and Mavi Bulvar. Metro line starts in Çukurova and goes Seyhan and Yüreğir districts. Metro accepts bus cards (KentKart) for payment and runs between 06:00 A.M. and 23:00 P.M.

Bus Services are using by all alongside of district and other districts. There are two types of bus services: The ones that owned by Adana Metropolitan Municipality (people buses), and the ones that partly controlled by the municipality (special people buses). People buses (known as Reds, Kırmızılar) is only accept bus cards (KentKart) for payment. But special people buses (known as Canlar) are also accept cash.

Minibuses are serving the neighbourhoods and transport people to the city centre. It's accepting cash and Kentkart. There is a few minibus services serving the Çukurova: Topel, İtimat, Özen, Cemalpaşa, Denizli, Barkal, and Yeşilevler.

References 

 
Populated places in Adana Province
Districts of Adana Province